Cenchrus setaceus, commonly known as crimson fountaingrass, is a C4 perennial bunch grass that is native to open, scrubby habitats in East Africa,  tropical Africa, the Middle East and south-western Asia.  It has been introduced to many parts of the world as an ornamental plant, and has become an invasive species in some of them. It is drought-tolerant, grows fast, reaches 3 feet in height, and has many purple, plumose flower spikes.

Environmental threat
Fountaingrass has been introduced to the Canary Islands, Sicily, Sardinia, southern Spain, Australia, South Africa, Hawaii, the western United States, southern Florida and New Caledonia. It thrives in warmer, drier areas and threatens many native species, with which it competes very effectively as an invasive species. It also tends to increase the risk of intense wildfires, to which it is well adapted, thus posing a further threat to certain native species.

In Europe, Fountain grass is included since 2017 in the list of Invasive Alien Species of Union concern (the Union list). This implies that this species cannot be imported, cultivated, transported, commercialized, planted, or intentionally released into the environment in the whole of the European Union.

Gallery

References

External links
 Sonoran Desert conservation fact sheet

Bunchgrasses of Africa
Bunchgrasses of Asia
Flora of North Africa
Flora of Northeast Tropical Africa
Flora of East Tropical Africa
Flora of the Arabian Peninsula
Flora of Western Asia
Garden plants of Asia
Garden plants of Africa
Perennial plants